McKibben  is the name of:

 Bill McKibben (born 1960), environmentalist and author
 Chip McKibben (born 1965), American rower
 Glenn Arthur McKibben, New Zealand police officer killed in 1996
 Chuck McKibben (born 1947), voice actor
 Howard D. McKibben (born 1940), jurist
 Larry McKibben (born 1947), politician
 Matty McKibben, fictional character in the American TV series Awkward
 Ray McKibben (1945 or 1946–1968), soldier and Medal of Honor recipient
 Samuel N. McKibben, 19th century American after whom the S. M. McKibben House is named
 Sherry McKibben (born 1944), a Canadian politician and social worker

See also
 McKibben artificial muscle
 Mount McKibben
 McKibbin (disambiguation)